The Gallery Waldinger is an art museum in Osijek, Croatia. It is located in Tvrđa. It is named after Adolf Waldinger, a Croatian painter from Osijek.

External links 

 Gradske galerije Osijek 
 Waldinger Gallery building in the Faculty Street in Osijek

W
W